María Jesús Santolaria is a Spanish taekwondo practitioner. 

She won a gold medal in lightweight at the 1993 World Taekwondo Championships in New York City, by defeating Ineabelle Díaz in the semifinal, and Park Kyung-suk in the final.

References

External links

Year of birth missing (living people)
Living people
Spanish female taekwondo practitioners
World Taekwondo Championships medalists
20th-century Spanish women
21st-century Spanish women